Clutia is a plant genus of the family Peraceae. It is native to sub-Saharan Africa and to the Arabian Peninsula.

Species

formerly included
moved to other genera (Bridelia Cleistanthus Croton Ditaxis Lachnostylis Phyllanthus Pseudophyllanthus Sauropus Trigonostemon )

References

Malpighiales genera
Peraceae